Chiang Wei-shui (6 August 1890 – 5 August 1931) was a Taiwanese physician and activist. He was a founding member of the Taiwanese Cultural Association and the Taiwanese People's Party. He is seen as one of the most important figures in Taiwan's resistance movement against Japanese rule.

He once wrote a short essay on Taiwan called Certificate of Bedside Diagnosis or Certificate of Clinical Diagnosis (臨床講義) about how the patient (Taiwan) suffered from severe culture malnutrition. Written in the form of a medical examination, it is his most famous work.

Biography
Chiang was born in Yilan during the Qing Dynasty rule. At the age of 10 he began to study with a Confucian scholar (張鏡光). In 1915 he graduated from the Taiwan Medical College, now the National Taiwan University College of Medicine. Around 1919 he married Chen Tian.

In 1920 he began participating in the movement to found the Taiwan Assembly. In 1921 he helped found the Taiwan Cultural Association. He was imprisoned for four months in 1923 and again in 1925 for his opposition to the Japanese colonial government. During this time, Chen Tian would lecture in his stead, continuing the promotion of his ideas. In total, Chiang was imprisoned twelve times.

In 1927, the Taiwan Cultural Association split because of an internal ideological division between rightists and leftists. Chiang went on to help found the Taiwanese People's Party on a platform of unity. The Taiwan People's Party was the first legal party to be founded in Taiwan. He came under criticism from rightists in the government. The Taiwan People's Party contacted the League of Nations several times to protest Japanese issuance of special permits for opium sale as well as the Wushe Incident.

The Taiwanese People's Party's political philosophy was the Three Principles of the People, but  and others pushed for a revolutionary line. In 1931, the colonial administration forced the dissolution of the party. Chiang died of typhoid that same year, at the age of 40 (41 by traditional Chinese reckoning).

Writing in the 1970s in the context of the nativist and tangwai movements, Huang Huang-hsiung described Chiang as Taiwan's Sun Yat-sen.

His grave was located in Taipei Public Cemetery No. 6, on Chongde St., near Liuzhangli Station, until October 2015, when his remains were moved to Cherry Blossom Cemetery in Yilan.

Legacy

 continued advocating for democratization in the wake of his elder brother's death. The younger Chiang was elected to the Taipei City Council in the 1939 local elections held under Japanese rule, joined the Kuomintang upon their arrival in Taiwan, and, after the February 28 incident of 1947, dedicated himself to negotiating with the Chen Yi-led government on the behalf of the people. Chen later ordered the Taiwan People's Association cofounded by Chiang Wei-chuan to change its name to the Taiwan Provincial Political Construction Association and subsequently disband. Chiang then went into hiding for a year. Chiang Wei-chuan died in 1975.

A  freeway tunnel passing under Xueshan to link Taipei with Yilan was opened in 2006. It marked the completion of Taiwan's latest freeway, which was subsequently named the Chiang Wei-shui Freeway in a move that pleased all sides of the political spectrum in Taiwan.

Chiang was featured on a commemorative 10 New Taiwan Dollar coin in 2010.

References

External links
Taiwan Panorama Magazine:Nationalist Pioneer Chiang Wei-shui
Taiwan Yearbook: Land Transportation, Chiang Wei-shui Freeway
Theatre Production: The Impossible Times: Chiang Wei-shui

1890 births
1931 deaths
National Taiwan University alumni
Taiwanese activists
Taiwanese people of Hoklo descent
20th-century Taiwanese politicians
Taiwanese democracy activists
Taiwanese revolutionaries
People from Yilan County, Taiwan
Taiwanese prisoners and detainees
Prisoners and detainees of Japan
20th-century Taiwanese physicians
Taiwanese hospital administrators
Infectious disease deaths in Taiwan
Deaths from typhoid fever